Christopher Hawkes was an English archaeologist specialising in European prehistory.

Christopher Hawkes may also refer to:

 Christopher Hawkes (cricketer) (born 1972), English cricketer
 Chris Hawkes (born 1982), American songwriter

See also
 Chris Hawk (1951–2009), American surfer and board shaper